Hexagonia is a genus of poroid fungi in the family Polyporaceae. The genus has a widespread distribution, especially in tropical regions. The generic name is derived from the Latin word hexagonus, meaning "with six angles".

Species
, Index Fungorum accepts 41 species in Hexagonia:
Hexagonia amplexens Pat. (1902)
Hexagonia angulata Lloyd (1920)
Hexagonia annamitica Pat. (1927)
Hexagonia applanata (Bres.) Lloyd (1920)
Hexagonia assaortina Sacc. & Bacc. (1917)
Hexagonia bartlettii Massee (1908)
Hexagonia bicolor McAlpine (1904)
Hexagonia bivalvis (Pers.) Bres. (1913)
Hexagonia burchellii Lloyd (1910)
Hexagonia caliginosa Lloyd (1922)
Hexagonia caperata (Pat.) Murrill (1904)
Hexagonia casuarinae Pat. (1901)
Hexagonia cucullata (Mont.) Murrill (1904) – Cameroon
Hexagonia culmicola Niemelä & Kotir. (2015)
Hexagonia cuprea Bres. (1911)
Hexagonia dermatiphora Lloyd (1911)
Hexagonia fioriana Sacc. (1910)
Hexagonia fuscoglabra Lloyd (1922)
Hexagonia heteropora (Mont.) Imazeki (1943)
Hexagonia hydnoides (Sw.) M. Fidalgo (1968)
Hexagonia leprosa Fr. (1851) – Pernambuco
Hexagonia mirabilis Lloyd (1910)
Hexagonia olivacea Lloyd (1914)
Hexagonia phaeopora Pat. (1907)
Hexagonia pobeguinii Har. (1892) – Africa
Hexagonia purpurascens (Berk. & M.A. Curtis) Murrill (1904)
Hexagonia retropicta (Bres.) Lloyd (1922)
Hexagonia reyesii Pat. (1914)
Hexagonia rhodopora Pat. (1912)
Hexagonia seuratii Pat. (1906)
Hexagonia similis Berk. (1846) – New South Wales
Hexagonia tenuiformis Murrill (1912)
Hexagonia tenuis (Hook.) Fr. (1838) – Africa; Asia; South America
Hexagonia umbrinella Fr. (1845)
Hexagonia umbrosa Lloyd (1920)
Hexagonia velutina Pat. & Har. (1893)
Hexagonia vesparia (Berk.) Ryvarden (1972) – Australia
Hexagonia warburgiana (Henn.) Teixeira (1992)
Hexagonia wightii (Klotzsch) Fr. (1838)
Hexagonia zambeziana Torrend (1914)

References

Polyporaceae
Polyporales genera
Taxa named by Elias Magnus Fries
Taxa described in 1838